U.S. Highway 287 (US 287) is the portion of a north-south highway in Colorado that travels from the Oklahoma state line just south of Campo to the Wyoming state line north of Fort Collins.

Route description

Heading from the Oklahoma border, US 287 and US 385, upon entering the state, pass through Campo, and make an interchange with US 160 south of Springfield. In Lamar and Carlton, the highways split at an interchange with US 50, where US 287 continues north, this time concurrent with US 50. Just outside the town the highways make a sharp turn toward the west, and the road heading north is SH 196. South of Wiley, US 50 heads west, while US 287 turns north toward Wiley. East of Eads, Colorado US 287 turns toward the west again, briefly merging with SH 96. In Eads SH 96 continues west, while US 287 moves north. Just east of Kit Carson, US 287 again turns toward the west and merges with US 40. East of Limon, the two highways make two interchanges with I-70 before entering Limon. After a brief concurrency with US 24, the two highways merge with I-70. Near the outskirts of Aurora US 36 merges with the group of highways as well.

Just past E-470, I-70 and US 36 split to follow a more northerly course, while US 287 and US 40 continue west into Downtown Denver on Colfax Avenue. The I-25, US 6, US 87, and US 85 interchange marks US 287's second junction with its parent route, US 87. Shortly thereafter, at a cloverleaf interchange with Federal Boulevard, SH 88 runs south, US 40 continues west, and US 287 turns north on Federal Boulevard. After crossing I-76 and then US 36 for a second time, US 287 turns west onto 120th Avenue where it overlaps SH 128. Just before meeting US 36 again in Broomfield, US 287 bends back to the north, leaving CO 128 to continues west. At Baseline Road in Lafayette, SH 7 joins US 287 for about a mile, before it splits to the west on Arapahoe Avenue towards Boulder. US 287 intersects SH 119 as it enters Longmont on the very busy Main Street, then intersects SH 66 at the north edge of town. The road bypasses Berthoud en route to Loveland, where US 287 splits into the pair of one-way streets. US 287 passes through Fort Collins on College Avenue, merging with SH 14 at Jefferson Street. On the edge of the mountains, SH 14 splits and heads west into Poudre Canyon, while US 287 continues north into Wyoming. The section of US 287 between Fort Collins, Colorado and Laramie, Wyoming carries very heavy truck traffic and was once considered dangerous.

History
The original US 287 only traveled from Denver past the Wyoming state line in 1935. In 1940, US 287 was expanded past the Oklahoma state line (to Port Arthur, Texas), replacing US 285.

After a head-on crash on the highway in 2001, there were people lobbying for a widening of US 287 at the Wyoming state line. Their request was answered in April 2009. Throughout 2012, the highway was expanded to three lanes north of Fort Collins, was resurfaced, and contained shoulders to prevent such accidents.

Junction list

See also

 List of U.S. Highways in Colorado

References

External links

87-2
 Colorado
Transportation in Baca County, Colorado
Transportation in Prowers County, Colorado
Transportation in Kiowa County, Colorado
Transportation in Cheyenne County, Colorado
Transportation in Lincoln County, Colorado
Transportation in Elbert County, Colorado
Transportation in Arapahoe County, Colorado
Transportation in Adams County, Colorado
Transportation in Denver
Transportation in Broomfield, Colorado
Transportation in Boulder County, Colorado
Transportation in Larimer County, Colorado